Turecká is a village and municipality in Banská Bystrica District in the Banská Bystrica Region of central Slovakia.

History
In historical records the village was first mentioned in 1563.

Geography
The municipality lies at an altitude of 610 metres and covers an area of 10.163 km². It has a population of about 147 people.

References

External links
 https://web.archive.org/web/20140113205216/http://turecka.sk/

Villages and municipalities in Banská Bystrica District